Mihoshi Sugisawa (born 17 August 2002) is a Japanese professional footballer who plays as a defender for WE League club Omiya Ardija Ventus.

Club career 
Sugisawa made her WE League debut on 20 September 2021.

References 

WE League players
Living people
2002 births
Japanese women's footballers
Women's association football defenders
Omiya Ardija Ventus players
Association football people from Kanagawa Prefecture